"Before My Time" is a song written by Ben Peters, and recorded by American country music artist John Conlee.  It was released in August 1979 as the first single from the album Forever.  The song reached #2 on the Billboard Hot Country Singles & Tracks chart.

Chart performance

References

1979 singles
John Conlee songs
Songs written by Ben Peters
MCA Records singles
1979 songs